Sulawesiella rafaelae is a species of beetle in the family Cerambycidae, and the only species in the genus Sulawesiella. It was described by Lansberge in 1885.

References

Tmesisternini
Beetles described in 1885